Kendua High School, is a non-government educational institution in Kendua, Tangail, Dhaka Division, Bangladesh established in 1971. The school offers education for students ranging from six to SSC (Secondary School Certificate) with over 500 students. The school is under the direct control of the Ministry of Education.

Location
The school is in Kendua, Dhanbari Upazila, 65 km from Tangail, Mymensingh and Jamalpur district headquarters and 190 km from Dhaka city. The school is on the bank of Jhinai River.

Gallery

References

Schools in Tangail District
Education in Tangail
Educational institutions established in 1971
1971 establishments in Bangladesh